Ricardo Jorge Jaar is a Honduran academic and businessman, known for his contributions in  higher education and corporate social responsibility. He was born in San Pedro Sula, Honduras.

Personal data
His parents are Mr. Jorge E. Jaar Q.D.D.G., and Mrs. Elena J Larach de Jaar. He has two sisters and three brothers.

Higher education
In February 1991, Jaar received a Bachelor of Science Degree in Systems Analysis and Engineering from The George Washington University, Washington, DC, and in May 1993, he received a Master of Arts Degree in Applied Economics at The American University, Washington, DC.

Academic career
In 1994 after graduating from The American University, Washington DC., Ricardo J. Jaar returned to his home in San Pedro Sula, Honduras and became a professor at the local university, Universidad de San Pedro Sula in 1995. His teaching responsibilities included a wide range of subjects from economics to operations research. He became a member of the Board of Directors of this institution and today, eventually becoming the Director of that Board, Executive President of the university, and President of Campus Television, the first HD TV station in the country;. In 2004, Ricardo J. Jaar founded Fundacion Educar, a non-profit organization that provides refurbished computers free of charge to public schools and to less fortunate communities in Honduras www.fundaeducar.org with the support of Computadores Para Educar from Colombia.

Jaar was part of the organization committee  of the XXVII Model OAS General Assembly (MOAS) celebrated in San Pedro Sula, Honduras 27–30 April 2009  and has successfully organized  presidential debates  in Honduras for the past 2  presidential elections ., and has organized for several years, along with  the US Embassy in Honduras and Fundacion Covelo, the program " Sueño Hondureño"  to encourage students from public schools to form their own micro-enterprises and provides real-world business experience

Awards and honors
Dean's Commendation List at The George Washington University, Washington, D.C. 
Ricardo J. Jaar has also received numerous awards for his efforts in the education field, among them: Galardón La Concordia, given by The German Technical Cooperation (GTZ), and COHEP the Honduran National Business Council, for best practices in Social responsibility.  in 2008 Consejo Iberoamericano en Honor a la Calidad Educativa awarded Mr. Jaar  the  Title Honoris Causa  de Iberoamerica and the Honorific Title  of Master en Gestión Educativa de Iberoamérica

Other activity
Other positions held by Mr. Jaar in the Honduran community are:  Member of the Board of Directors of  INTERLEASE S.A. de C.V. (Commercial Vehicles Dealership  and leasing company) and Counselor to the Board of Directors of Fundación Hondureña de Responsabilidad Social Empresarial (FUNDAHRSE).

References

1968 births
Living people
Academic staff of the University of San Pedro Sula
Honduran businesspeople
American University alumni
George Washington University School of Engineering and Applied Science alumni